The 2010–11 season will be Esteghlal's 10th season in the Iran Pro League, and their 59th season in the top division of Iranian football. They will also be competing in the Hazfi Cup and AFC Champions League, and 66th year in existence as a football club.

Club

Coaching staff

Other information

Player

First team squad
Last updated 7 December 2010

Iran Pro League squad
As of 1 September 2010. Esteghlal F.C. Iran Pro League Squad 2010-11

 

 (c)

AFC Champions League squad
As of 02 February 2011. Esteghlal F.C. Champions League Squad 2010-11

 

 (c)

Transfers

Summer transfers

In:

Out:

Winter transfers

In:

Out:

Competitions

Iran Pro League

Results by round

Results summary

League standings

Matches

AFC Champions League

Group stage

Hazfi Cup

Matches

Round of 32

Round of 16

Quarterfinals

Semifinals

Statistics

Appearances

|}

Top scorers
Community Shield and Pre season goals are not recognized as competitive match goals.

All competitions

Iran Pro League

AFC Champions League

Hazfi Cup

Top assistors
Includes all competitive matches.

Community Shield and Pre season assists are not recognized as competitive match assist.

Disciplinary record
Includes all competitive matches. Players with 1 card or more included only.

Last updated on 22 February 2011

Goals conceded 
 Updated on 21 May 2011

Own goals 
 Updated on 2 April 2011

Overall 

{|class="wikitable" style="text-align: center;"
|-
!
!Total
!Home 
!Away
!Neutral
|-
|align=left| Games played          || 44 || 22 || 22 || N/A
|-
|align=left| Games won             || 23 || 15 || 8 || N/A
|-
|align=left| Games drawn           || 13 || 4 || 9 || N/A
|-
|align=left| Games lost            || 8 || 3 || 5 || N/A
|-
|align=left| Biggest win           || 6–2 vs Sanat Naft || 6–2 vs Sanat Naft || 4–1 vs PAS Hamedan || N/A
|-
|align=left| Biggest loss          || 1–4 vs Foolad || 1–2 vs Foolad  1–2 vs Zob Ahan  1–2 vs Tractor Sazi  1–2 vs Al-Nassr   1–2 vs Pakhtakor || 1–4 vs Foolad || N/A
|-
|align=left| Biggest win (League)  || 6–2 vs Sanat Naft || 6–2 vs Sanat Naft || 3–1 vs Steel Azin  3–1 vs Paykan  2–0 vs PAS Hamedan || N/A
|-
|align=left| Biggest win (Cup)     || 4–1 vs PAS Hamedan || 2–0 vs Shahrdari Yasuj || 4–1 vs PAS Hamedan || N/A
|-
|align=left| Biggest win (Asia)    || 4–2 vs Pakhtakor || 4–2 vs Pakhtakor || N/A || N/A
|-
|align=left| Biggest loss (League) || 1–4 vs Foolad || 1–2 vs Foolad  1–2 vs Zob Ahan  1–2 vs Tractor Sazi || 1–4 vs Foolad || N/A
|-
|align=left| Biggest loss (Cup)    || 1–2 vs Malavan || N/A || 1–2 vs Malavan || N/A
|-
|align=left| Biggest loss (Asia)   || 1–2 vs Al-Nassr   1–2 vs Pakhtakor || N/A || 1–2 vs Al-Nassr   1–2 vs Pakhtakor || N/A
|-
|align=left| Clean sheets          || 16 || 9 || 7 || N/A
|-
|align=left| Goals scored          || 74 || 45 || 29 || N/A
|-
|align=left| Goals conceded        || 47 || 23 || 24 || N/A
|-
|align=left| Goal difference       || +27 || +22 || +5 || N/A
|-
|-
|-
|align=left| Points               || 82/132 (%) || 49/66 (%) || 33/66 (%) || N/A
|-
|align=left| Winning rate         || % || % || % || N/A
|-
|align=left| Most appearances     || 41 || align=left colspan=3|  Pejman Montazeri
|-
|align=left| Top scorer           || 16 || align=left colspan=3|  Arash Borhani   Farhad Majidi
|-
|align=left| Top assistor         || 9 || align=left colspan=3|  Farhad Majidi
|-

See also

2010–11 Persian Gulf Cup
2010–11 Hazfi Cup
2011 AFC Champions League

References

External links
Iran Premier League Statistics
Persian League

2010-11
Iranian football clubs 2010–11 season